The Tower of Pietranera was a Genoese tower located in the hamlet of Pietranera in the commune of San-Martino-di-Lota on the east coast of Corsica. The tower no longer exists.

The tower was one of a series of coastal defences constructed by the Republic of Genoa between 1530 and 1620 to stem the attacks by Barbary pirates.

See also
List of Genoese towers in Corsica

References

Towers in Corsica